The 2005 Canadian Open curling Grand Slam tournament was held January 27–30, 2005 at the MTS Centre in Winnipeg, Manitoba.

The final was an all-Edmonton match between Kevin Martin's rink and his rivals, the Randy Ferbey rink. Martin won the game 8–7, taking home $30,000 for his team.

Round robin standings
Final Round Robin Standings

Tie breakers
The scores for the tie breaker matches were as follows:
 Burtnyk 6-5  Boehmer
 Trulsen 9-5  Middaugh

Playoffs
The playoff bracket was as follows:

References

External links
Event site

2005 in Canadian curling
Curling competitions in Winnipeg
2005
2005 in Manitoba
January 2005 sports events in Canada